The Paris Collection may refer to:

 The Paris Collection (Dollar album), 1980
 The Paris Collection (Camel album), 2001